Joel Levin is an American psychologist. He received the E. L. Thorndike Award in 2002.

References

Living people
21st-century American psychologists
Year of birth missing (living people)
Place of birth missing (living people)